Seán Harrington (1900–1976) was an Irish republican paramilitary who later became a prominent member of the Society of Friends.

Biography 
Born in Dublin, Harrington joined the Irish Republican Army (IRA), and fought in the Irish War of Independence.  He opposed the Anglo-Irish Treaty and remained with the IRA through the Irish Civil War.
On release, Harrington relocated to Dublin, where he found work as the caretaker at the Court Laundry.  This was a difficult role, as local levels of crime were high.  In December, he was tied to his bed and beaten, taking three months to recover; he apprehended an armed robber in April 1946.  He broke his links with the paramilitary movement and also left the Catholic church, joining a group of Quakers; this group attracted some opposition, and Harrington lost the hearing in one ear after being attacked by a group of young Catholic extremists.

By the late 1960s, Harrington had left Ireland and moved to Tring in Hertfordshire.

References

1900 births
1976 deaths
Converts to Quakerism from Roman Catholicism
Irish Quakers
Irish Republican Army (1919–1922) members
Military personnel from Dublin (city)
People of the Irish War of Independence
20th-century Quakers